Kevin Wright (born 1953) is an Australian cricketer.

Kevin Wright may refer to:

Kevin Wright (Australian footballer) (1933–2003), Australian rules footballer
Kevin Wright (footballer, born 1995) (born 1995), Sierra Leonean footballer
Kevin Wright (producer)